This is a list of tennis players who have represented the South Africa Fed Cup team in an official Fed Cup match. South Africa have taken part in the competition since 1963.

Players

References

External links
Tennis South Africa

Fed Cup
Lists of Billie Jean King Cup tennis players